This list of tallest buildings in Kolkata enumerates High-rise buildings and Skyscrapers in Kolkata. Currently Kolkata is home to around 800 completed high-rise buildings, and many more high-rise buildings are under construction. The 42 which was completed in 2019 is currently the tallest building in Kolkata with a height of  consisting of 65 floors.

Overview 

Kolkata's high-rises are primarily concentrated in and around Chowringhee, which is the Central Business District (CBD) of the city, EM bypass area and Newtown-Rajarhat area. Everest House (21 floors), built in 1978, is also located in Chowringhee. Apart from the CBD, the region of B.B.D. Bagh and Babughat also have several high-rises. The Salt Lake City and Rajarhat New Town regions (which already have several high-rises)  are undergoing a massive construction boom, with hundreds of high-rises under construction. The city got its first residential high-rise in 2004 when the 'Peak' block was opened in Hiland Park. This created a new idea of constructing residential high-rises other than office buildings or commercial buildings. In 2008, South City Towers (36 floors),  were completed near Jodhpur Park in South Kolkata which became the first -plus buildings of the city. All these developments have changed the skyline of this city.

Currently Kolkata has around 60 completed high-rise building whose height is over 100 meter and many more high-rise buildings are under construction. There are plans to extend the Urbana society to the group of buildings called Urbana II and the Urbana Twisted Tower, which are over 200 and 300 metres tall, respectively.

Tallest buildings 

This lists ranks buildings in Kolkata that stand at least , based on standard height measurement. This includes spires and architectural details but does not include antenna masts. Only completed buildings and under-construction buildings that have been topped out are included.

Tallest under construction 

This lists buildings that are under construction in the city and are planned to rise at least . Buildings that are only approved, on-hold or proposed are not included in this table.
Important note: due to the airport authority, the projects has been delayed and somewhere the height has been reduced.

Approved, proposed and on-hold
This list ranks buildings that are proposed, on-hold and approved in the city. All the buildings listed below are slated to rise at least .

Timeline of tallest buildings in Kolkata
The buildings listed here stand at least  from the ground.

See also 
 List of tallest buildings in India
 List of tallest residential buildings
 List of tallest buildings in different cities in India

References

External links 

Kolkata-related lists
Buildings and structures in Kolkata
Lists of tallest buildings in India
Lists of buildings and structures in West Bengal